Grant Township is a township in Plymouth County, Iowa in the United States. The township is named after.

The elevation of Grant Township is listed as 1355 feet above mean sea level.

References

Townships in Iowa